Richard Lyon (born February 25, 1958) is an American puppeteer, actor, and puppet designer and builder. He has worked for The Jim Henson Company as one of the operators of Big Bird. He appeared on Broadway originating the roles of Trekkie Monster, Nicky, the blue Bad Idea Bear, and other characters in the Tony Award-winning musical Avenue Q, a musical for which he designed and created all of the puppets. In the fall of 2005 he reprised his roles in the production of the show in Las Vegas for eight months before returning to the Broadway cast. Rick was a puppeteer on Sesame Street for 15 seasons, from 1987 to 2002. He also worked with Nickelodeon on the Stick Stickly project and on the Me + My Friends pilot. He was a lead puppeteer for the first season of Comedy Central's television program Crank Yankers. Rick has also appeared numerous times on The Late Show with Stephen Colbert, for which he also provided the puppets he performed. Rick puppeteered a xenomorph chest burster in an "Alien" parody sketch with guest star Sigourney Weaver, and Yoda, Kermit the Frog, and Big Bird in satirical sketches, a pair of singing pants, and the Number Two. He also performed the Kukla, Fran, and Ollie-inspired puppets for the black and white throwback clip on the "15th Episode Anniversary Show" of At Home with Amy Sedaris.

Lyon's company, The Lyon Puppets, maintains a large permanent workshop outside New York City in New Jersey. In addition to building all of the Broadway and Las Vegas Avenue Q puppets, the company has built puppets for the original West End production of Avenue Q in London, the US national tour, and international productions in Brazil, Mexico, Australia, Switzerland, Germany, France, and China. Rick frequently coaches actors in puppetry for productions of Avenue Q for which he provides puppets. He also directed a production of Avenue Q at Smithtown PAC.

He studied theater at Penn State University and puppetry at the Institute of Professional Puppetry Arts in Connecticut and the Institut International de la Marionnette in France.

Puppeteering credits
 Sesame Street - television
 Crank Yankers - television
 Bear in the Big Blue House - television
 Avenue Q - Broadway
 Muppet*Vision 3D - film attraction at Disney's Hollywood Studios
 The Book of Pooh - television
 Teenage Mutant Ninja Turtles II: The Secret of the Ooze - film
 Teenage Mutant Ninja Turtles III - film
 The Neverending Story III - film
 Men in Black - film
 Binyah Binyah! - television
 Me and My Friends - television
 The Late Show With Stephen Colbert - television
 At Home with Amy Sedaris - television

References

External links
 
 Lyon Puppets
 Lyon Puppets Facebook Page

Living people
American puppeteers
American male stage actors
Muppet performers
Sesame Street Muppeteers
Penn State College of Arts and Architecture alumni
Artists from Rochester, New York
1958 births